Compagnoni is an Italian surname.

 Achille Compagnoni (1914–2009), Italian mountain climber and skier
 Aristide Compagnoni (b. 1910), Italian cross-country skier
 Deborah Compagnoni (b. 1970), Italian alpine skier
 Ottavio Compagnoni (b. 1926), Italian cross-country skier
 Severino Compagnoni (b. 1917), Italian cross-country skier